Fifth Avenue Historic District may refer to:

in the United States
(by state)
Fifth Avenue Historic District (Pine Bluff, Arkansas), listed on the listed on the NRHP in Jefferson County, Arkansas
Fifth Avenue Commercial Buildings, a historic district in St. Cloud, Minnesota, listed on the NRHP in Stearns County, Minnesota 
Fifth Avenue-Fulton Street Historic District, Troy, New York, a historic district subsumed into Central Troy Historic District
Fifth Avenue and North High Historic District, Columbus, Ohio, listed on the NRHP in Columbus, Ohio
Fifth Avenue Historic District (Nashville, Tennessee), listed on the NRHP in Nashville, Tennessee 
Fifth Avenue Historic District (Kenbridge, Virginia), listed on the NRHP in Lunenburg County, Virginia